People who served as the mayor of the Municipality of Annandale are:

References

Mayors Annandale
Annandale, Mayors
Mayors of Annandale